Korres may refer to:

 Emmanouil Korres (born 1948), Greek restoration architect, civil engineer and professor of architectural history
 Korres, Greek cosmetic company
 Korres Engineering, Greek company
 Korres, Álava, hamlet in Spain

See also
 Corres, surname